Two ships and one shore establishment of the Royal Navy have been named HMS Tern:

 HMS Tern was a paddle minesweeper cancelled in 1918
  was a gunboat launched in 1927 and scuttled in 1941.
 HMS Tern was a Royal Navy Air Station in operation between 1941 and 1946.
 

Royal Navy ship names